Rajiv Gandhi University is a university in Arunachal Pradesh, India.

Rajiv Gandhi University may also refer to the following other universities in India:
 Assam Rajiv Gandhi University of Cooperative Management, in Assam
 Rajiv Gandhi Proudyogiki Vishwavidyalaya, in Madhya Pradesh
 Rajiv Gandhi Institute of Medical Sciences, Kadapa, in Andhra Pradesh
 Rajiv Gandhi University of Knowledge Technologies, Nuzvid, in Andhra Pradesh
 Rajiv Gandhi University of Knowledge Technologies, in Telangana
 Rajiv Gandhi University of Health Sciences, in Karnataka